In mathematics, specifically in representation theory, a semisimple representation (also called a completely reducible representation) is a linear representation of a group or an algebra that is a direct sum of simple representations (also called irreducible representations). It is an example of the general mathematical notion of semisimplicity.

Many representations that appear in applications of representation theory are semisimple or can be approximated by semisimple representations. A semisimple module over an algebra over a field is an example of a semisimple representation. Conversely, a semisimple representation of a group G over a field k is a semisimple module over the group ring k[G].

Equivalent characterizations 
Let V be a representation of a group G; or more generally, let V be a vector space with a set of linear endomorphisms acting on it. In general, a vector space acted on by a set of linear endomorphisms is said to be simple (or irreducible) if the only invariant subspaces for those operators are zero and the vector space itself; a semisimple representation then is a direct sum of simple representations in that sense.

The following are equivalent:
 V is semisimple as a representation.
 V is a sum of simple subrepresentations.
 Each subrepresentation W of V admits a complementary representation: a subrepresentation W such that .

The equivalences of the above conditions can be shown based on the next lemma, which is of independent interest:

Proof of the lemma: Write  where  are simple representations. Without loss of generality, we can assume  are subrepresentations; i.e., we can assume the direct sum is internal. Now, consider the family of all possible direct sums  with various subsets . Put the partial ordering on it by saying the direct sum over K is less than the direct sum over J if . By Zorn's lemma, we can find a maximal  such that . We claim that . By definition,  so we only need to show that . If  is a proper subrepresentatiom of  then there exists  such that . Since  is simple (irreducible), . Hence,   is a section of p. 

Note that we cannot take  to the set of  such that . Let  be the natural surjection. In this case,  but  because this sum is not direct. 

Proof of equivalences : Take p to be the natural surjection . Since V is semisimple, p splits and so, through a section,  is isomorphic to a subrepretation that is complementary to W.

: We shall first observe that every nonzero subrepresentation W has a simple subrepresentation. Shrinking W to a (nonzero) cyclic subrepresentation we can assume it is finitely generated. By modular law, it implies . Then  is a simple subrepresentation
of W ("simple" because of maximality). This establishes the observation. Now, take  to be the sum of all simple subrepresentations, which, by 3., admits a complementary representation . If , then, by the early observation,  contains a simple subrepresentation and so , a nonsense. Hence, .

: The implication is a direct generalization of a basic fact in linear algebra that a basis can be extracted from a spanning set of a vector space. That is we can prove the following slightly more precise statement:
When  is a sum of simple subrepresentations, a semisimple decomposition , some subset , can be extracted from the sum.
As in the proof of the lemma, we can find a maximal direct sum  that consists of some ’s. In the second case, the direct sum  is a contradiction to the maximality of W. Hence, .

Examples and non-examples

Unitary representations
A finite-dimensional unitary representation (i.e., a representation factoring through a unitary group) is a basic example of a semisimple representation.

For example, given a continuous finite-dimensional complex representation  of a finite group or a compact group G, by the averaging argument, one can define an inner product  on V that is G-invariant: i.e., which is to say  is a unitary operator and so  is a unitary representation. Hence, every finite-dimensional continuous complex representation of G is semisimple. For a finite group, this is a special case of Maschke's theorem, which says a finite-dimensional representation of a finite group G over a field k with characteristic not dividing the order of G is semisimple.

Representations of semisimple Lie algebras
By Weyl's theorem on complete reducibility, every finite-dimensional representation of a semisimple Lie algebra over a field of characteristic zero is semisimple.

Separable minimal polynomials
Given a linear endomorphism T of a vector space V, V is semisimple as a representation of T (i.e., T is a semisimple operator) if and only if the minimal polynomial of T is separable; i.e., a product of distinct irreducible polynomials.

Associated semisimple representation
Given a finite-dimensional representation V, the Jordan–Hölder theorem says there is a filtration by subrepresentations:  such that each successive quotient  is a simple representation. Then the associated vector space  is a semisimple representation called an associated semisimple representation, which, up to an isomorphism, is uniquely determined by V.

Unipotent group non-example
A representation of a unipotent group is generally not semisimple. That is, there are exactly three G-subrepresentations of V; in particular, V is not semisimple (as a unique one-dimensional subrepresentation does not admit a complementary representation).

Semisimple decomposition and multiplicity 

The decomposition of a semisimple representation into simple ones, called a semisimple decomposition, need not be unique; for example, for a trivial representation, simple representations are one-dimensional vector spaces and thus a semisimple decomposition amounts to a choice of a basis of the representation vector space. The isotypic decomposition, on the other hand, is an example of a unique decomposition.

However, for a finite-dimensional semisimple representation V over an algebraically closed field, the numbers of simple representations up to isomorphisms appearing in the decomposition of V (1) are unique and (2) completely determine the representation up to isomorphisms; this is a consequence of Schur's lemma in the following way. Suppose a finite-dimensional semisimple representation V over an algebraically closed field is given: by definition, it is a direct sum of simple representations. By grouping together simple representations in the decomposition that are isomorphic to each other, up to an isomorphism, one finds a decomposition (not necessarily unique):

By Schur's lemma,
,
where  refers to the equivariant linear maps. Thus, the integers  are independent of chosen decompositions; they are the multiplicities of simple representations , up to isomorphisms, in V.

Isotypic decomposition 
There is a decomposition of a semisimple representation that is unique, called the isotypic decomposition of the representation. By definition, given a simple representation S, the isotypic component of type S of a representation V is the sum of all subrepresentations of V that are isomorphic to S; note the component is also isomorphic to the direct sum of some choice of subrepresentations isomorphic to S (so the component is unique, while the summands are not necessary so).

Then the isotypic decomposition of a semisimple representation V is the (unique) direct sum decomposition:

Example
Let  be the space of homogeneous degree-three polynomials over the complex numbers in variables . This is a finite-dimensional complex representation of a finite group, and so is semisimple. This can more easily be seen by writing this two-dimensional subspace as 
.
Another copy of  can be written in a similar form:
.
So can the third:
.

Completion 
In Fourier analysis, one decomposes a (nice) function as the limit of the Fourier series of the function. In much the same way, a representation itself may not be semisimple but it may be the completion (in a suitable sense) of a semisimple representation. The most basic case of this is the Peter–Weyl theorem, which decomposes the left (or right) regular representation of a compact group into the Hilbert-space completion of the direct sum of all simple unitary representations. As a corollary, there is a natural decomposition for  = the Hilbert space of (classes of) square-integrable functions on a compact group G:

where  means the completion of the direct sum and the direct sum runs over all isomorphism classes of simple finite-dimensional unitary representations  of G. Note here that every simple unitary representation (up to an isomorphism) appears in the sum with the multiplicity the dimension of the representation.

When the group G is a finite group, the vector space  is simply the group algebra of G and also the completion is vacuous. Thus, the theorem simply says that
 
That is, each simple representation of G appears in the regular representation with multiplicity the dimension of the representation. This is one of standard facts in the representation theory of a finite group (and is much easier to prove).

When the group G is the circle group , the theorem exactly amounts to the classical Fourier analysis.

Applications to physics
In quantum mechanics and particle physics, the angular momentum of an object can be described by complex representations of the rotation group|SO(3), all of which are semisimple. Due to connection between SO(3) and SU(2), the non-relativistic spin of an elementary particle is described by complex representations of SU(2) and the relativistic spin is described by complex representations of SL2(C), all of which are semisimple. In angular momentum coupling, Clebsch–Gordan coefficients arise from the multiplicities of irreducible representations occurring in the semisimple decomposition of a tensor product of irreducible representations.

Notes

References

Citations

Sources 

 ; NB: this reference, nominally, considers a semisimple module over a ring not over a group but this is not a material difference (the abstract part of the discussion goes through for groups as well).
 
 
 
 
 .

Representation theory